Soshi may refer to:

 Soshi Tanaka (born 1982), Japanese figure skater
 Okita Sōji (1842 or 1844–1868), also referred to as Okita Soshi, swordsman of the Shinsengumi 
 Girls' Generation, or SoShi, a South Korean girl group

See also
 Omoro Sōshi, a compilation of ancient poems and songs from Okinawa and the Amami Islands
 Sochi (disambiguation)

Japanese masculine given names